Dubakhshar (also Romanized as Dūbakhshar; also known as Dobakhshar and  Dowbakhsh) is a village in Ahmadsargurab Rural District, Ahmadsargurab District, Shaft County, Gilan Province, Iran. At the 2006 census, its population was 983, in 253 families.

References 

Populated places in Shaft County